Eden is a 2006 German film directed by  in which a chef falls for a married woman.

Cast
  - Gregor
 Charlotte Roche - Eden
 Devid Striesow - Xaver

References

External links
 

2006 films
German romantic drama films
2000s German films
Films about chefs